Oligosaccharide reducing-end xylanase (Rex, reducing end xylose-releasing exo-oligoxylanase) is an enzyme with systematic name beta-D-xylopyranosyl-(1->4)-beta-D-xylopyranose reducing-end xylanase. This enzyme catalyses the following chemical reaction

 Hydrolysis of (1->4)-beta-D-xylose residues from the reducing end of oligosaccharides

The enzyme acts rapidly on the beta-anomer of beta-D-xylopyranosyl-(1->4)-beta-D-xylopyranose.

References

External links 
 

EC 3.2.1